The Clergy Endowments (Canada) Act 1791, commonly known as the Constitutional Act 1791, was an Act of the Parliament of Great Britain which passed under George III. The current short title has been in use since 1896.

History

The act reformed the government of the Province of Quebec (1763-1791) to accommodate, amongst other Loyalists, the 10,000 United Empire Loyalists who had arrived from the United States following the American Revolution. The Province of Quebec, with a population of 145,000 French-speaking Canadians, was divided in two when the act took effect on 26 December 1791. The largely unpopulated western half became Upper Canada (now southern Ontario) and the eastern half became Lower Canada (now southern Quebec). The names Upper and Lower Canada were given according to their location along the St. Lawrence River. Upper Canada received English law and institutions, while Lower Canada retained French civil law and institutions, including feudal land tenure and the privileges accorded to the Roman Catholic Church.

The legislative Council for the Affairs of the Province of Quebec, with its subset Executive Council cabinet, was continued and reinforced by the establishment of freeholder-elected legislative assemblies. These elected assemblies led to a form of representative government in both colonies; the Province of Quebec had not previously had a legislative assembly.

The Constitutional Act attempted to create an established church by forming the clergy reserves, that is, grants of land reserved for the support of the (Protestant) Church of England. Income from the lease or sale of these reserves, which constituted one-seventh of the territory of Upper and Lower Canada, from 1791 went exclusively to the Church of England and, from 1824 on in a complex ratio, the (Presbyterian) Church of Scotland. These reserves created many difficulties in later years, making economic development difficult and creating resentment against the Anglican church, the Family Compact, and the Château Clique, although it did eventually lead to the growth of an Ottawa neighbourhood known as The Glebe. The act was problematic for both English and French speakers; the French Canadians and the Roman Catholic church in Quebec felt they might be overshadowed by Loyalist settlements and increased rights for Protestants, while the new English-speaking settlers felt the French still had too much power. However, both groups preferred the act and the institutions it created to the Quebec Act which it replaced.

The act is often seen as a watershed in the development of French Canadian nationalism as it provided for a province (Lower Canada) which the French considered to be their own, separate from English-speaking Upper Canada. The disjuncture between this French-Canadian ideal of Lower Canada as a distinct, national homeland and the reality of continued Anglo-Canadian political and economic dominance of the province after 1791 led to discontent and a desire for reform among intellectual segments of the French and English of Lower Canada. The frustration of French and English Patriots over the nature of Lower Canadian political and economic life in the province fuelled the Lower Canada Rebellion of 1837–38.

See also 
Constitutional history of Canada
Act of Union (1840)
Guy Carleton, 1st Baron Dorchester

Notes

References

External links
 

Great Britain Acts of Parliament 1791
Constitution of Canada
Political history of Ontario
Political history of Quebec
Lower Canada
Upper Canada
1791 in Canada
Constitutions of former British colonies